N class or Class N may refer to:

 N-class destroyer, a class of British Royal Navy ships
 NZR N class, a class of steam locomotives used by the New Zealand Railways Department and the Wellington and Manawatu Railway
 SECR N class, a type of steam locomotive designed in 1914 for use on the South Eastern and Chatham Railway (SECR)
 V/Line N class, a class of diesel locomotives built in Somerton, Victoria
 Westrail N class, a class of Australian diesel locomotives
 Sydney N-Class Tram, a type of streetcar
 United States N-class submarine, a class of US Navy submarines
 N-class blimp, a class of US Navy blimps
 N-class ferry, a class of Canadian ferries
 Victorian Railways N class steam locomotive

See also 
 N (disambiguation)